In elementary number theory, the lifting-the-exponent (LTE) lemma provides several formulas for computing the p-adic valuation  of special forms of integers. It is related to Hensel's lemma.

Background 
The exact origins of the LTE lemma are unclear; the result, with its present name and form, has only come into focus within the last 10 to 20 years. However, several key ideas used in its proof were known to Gauss and referenced in his Disquisitiones Arithmeticae. Despite chiefly featuring in mathematical olympiads, it is sometimes applied to research topics, such as elliptic curves.

Statements 

 When  is odd:
 If , then .
 When :
(Follows from the general case below.)
 Corollary:
 If , then  and thus .
 For all :
 If ,  and  odd, then .

Outline of proof

Base case 
The base case  when  is proven first. Because ,

The fact that  completes the proof. The condition  for odd  is similar.

General case (odd p) 
Via the binomial expansion, the substitution  can be used in (1) to show that  because (1) is a multiple of  but not . Likewise, .

Then, if  is written as  where , the base case gives . 

General case (p = 2) 
The proof for the odd  case cannot be directly applied when  because the binomial coefficient  is only an integral multiple of  when  is odd.

because since , each factor in the difference of squares step in the form  is congruent to 2 modulo 4.

The stronger statement  when  is proven analogously.

In competitions

Example problem 
The LTE lemma can be used to solve 2020 AIME I #12:
Solution. Note that . Using the LTE lemma, since  and  but , . Thus, .

Since , the factors of 5 are addressed by noticing that since the residues of  modulo 5 follow the cycle  and those of  follow the cycle , the residues of  modulo 5 cycle through the sequence . Thus,  iff  for some positive integer . The LTE lemma can now be applied again: . Since , . Hence .

Combining these three results, it is found that , which has  positive divisors.

References 

Lemmas in number theory